Parmarion is a genus of air-breathing land semi-slugs, terrestrial pulmonate gastropod mollusks in the family Ariophantidae. Parmarion is the type genus of the Parmarioninae, which is a synonym of Ostracolethinae.

Species of snails within this family make and use love darts.

Species
Species within the genus Parmarion include:
 Parmarion martensi Simroth, 1893
 Parmarion kersteni von Martens, 1869

References

Further reading 
 van Bentham Jutting W. S. S. (1950). "Systematic studies on the non-marine Mollusca of the Indo-Australian Archipelago. II. Critical revision of the Javanese pulmonate land-snails of the families Helicarionidae, Pleurodontidae, Fruticicolidae & Streptaxidae". Treubia 20: 381-505.

External links

 Taxonomy: 
 Image of a mating pair at 
 Image of an individual: 

Ariophantidae